West Indian Girl is an album by West Indian Girl, released in 2004.

Critical reception
Exclaim! wrote that "the one thing that [the band] succeed in doing well is creating music that seems to diffuse through a druggy haze, thanks to their dreamy pseudo-psychedelic sound that wouldn't have been out of place back in days of the Madchester."

Track listing
Written by West Indian Girl

Personnel
Chris Carter - keyboards
Mariqueen Maandig - vocals
Mark Lewis - drums
Robert James - Producer
Francis Ten - Additional Producer
Michael H. Brauner - Mixing Engineer
George Marino - Mastering Engineer
John Burke - Drums (on 'Trip')
Wayne Faler - Additional Guitar (on 'Trip')
Steve Utstein - Additional Keys, Cello

References

2004 debut albums
West Indian Girl albums
Astralwerks albums